The Grammy Award for Best Pop Vocal Album is an honor presented at the Grammy Awards, a ceremony that was established in 1958 and originally called the Gramophone Awards, to recording artists for quality vocal pop music albums. Awards in several categories are distributed annually  by the National Academy of Recording Arts and Sciences of the United States to "honor artistic achievement, technical proficiency  and overall excellence in the recording industry, without regard to album sales or chart position."

The honor was first presented in 1968 at the 10th Grammy Awards as Best Contemporary Album to The Beatles for Sgt. Pepper's Lonely Hearts Club Band. The category was then discontinued until 1995 where it emerged with the new name Best Pop Album. In 2001, the category became known as Best Pop Vocal Album. According to the category description guide for the 52nd Grammy Awards, the award is presented to artists that perform "albums containing at least 51% playing time of newly recorded pop vocal tracks."

The award goes to the artist, producer and engineer/mixer, provided they worked on more than 50% of playing time on the album. A producer or engineer/mixer who worked on less than 50% of playing time, as well as the mastering engineer, do not win an award, but can apply for a Winners Certificate.

Adele and Kelly Clarkson are the only two-time winners of this award, and Clarkson was the first to win twice. Clarkson, Ariana Grande and Justin Timberlake lead all performers with five nominations, though Clarkson and Grande are the only artists to have the most solo albums nominated; three of Timberlake's nominations are for solo albums, and two as a member of NSYNC.

Recipients

 

 Each year is linked to the article about the Grammy Awards held that year.

Artists with multiple wins
2 wins
 Adele
 Kelly Clarkson

Artists with multiple nominations

5 nominations
 Kelly Clarkson
 Ariana Grande
 Justin Timberlake (including 2 with NSYNC)

4 nominations
 Justin Bieber
 Lady Gaga
 Pink
 Taylor Swift

3 nominations
 Adele
 Coldplay
 Don Henley (including 2 with Eagles)
 Madonna
 Paul McCartney (including 1 with The Beatles)
 Sarah McLachlan
 Ed Sheeran
 James Taylor

2 nominations
 Christina Aguilera
 Sheryl Crow
 Lana Del Rey
 Celine Dion
 Eagles
 Billie Eilish
 Florence and the Machine
 George Harrison (including 1 with The Beatles)
 Norah Jones
 Annie Lennox
 Maroon 5
 Bruno Mars
 John Mayer
 NSYNC
 Katy Perry
 Britney Spears
 Gwen Stefani (including 1 with No Doubt)
 Sting
 Harry Styles

See also
 Grammy Award for Best Contemporary Instrumental Album

References

General
 
Specific

External links
 Official site of the Grammy Awards

Album awards
Pop Vocal Album
 
Pop Vocal Album